Aagaya Thamaraigal is a 1985 Indian Tamil-language film directed by V. Azhagappan, starring Suresh and Revathi.

Plot

Cast 

Suresh
Revathi
Mohana Priya
Jai Ganesh
Manorama
Sathyaraj
S. S. Chandran
Goundamani
Senthil

Soundtrack 
Soundtrack was composed by Gangai Amaran.
"Anandam" – Malaysia Vasudevan, S. P. Sailaja
"Mayanguthe" – S. Janaki
"Potta Potti" – Malaysia Vasudevan, Vani Jairam
"Gettikaari" – S. P. Sailaja
"Kannoram" – Gangai Amaran

Reception 
Kalki wrote suspecting that if he tells a love story as it is, it will go unnoticed, he has acted as if he has told a novel story along with sensational colors like armored police and tear gas. In that sense, the director is brilliant.

References

External links 
 

1980s Tamil-language films
1985 films
Films directed by V. Azhagappan
Films scored by Gangai Amaran